is a tile-matching puzzle video game released for the Windows and MS-DOS in 1994. It was created by Steve Fry for the Japanese company Zoo Corporation and published by Spectrum HoloByte, for the North American market.

The game would later be re-released on a number of different platforms. In the same year the game was ported for the Super NES and the original Game Boy. These two versions were developed by different companies and published by Spectrum HoloByte in North America. A year later, Shoeisha ported/published the game in Japan for the Sega Saturn and PlayStation.

Gameplay
In the game, the player must move the cursor amongst a grid of different colored squares. All squares must be "removed", and squares can only be removed if they are directly touching two or more squares of the same color. Once squares are removed, blocks then shift downward and either to the left or right, to fill in the blanks. The game ends when either all blocks are removed, or time has run out.

If the player comes to a point in which none of the remaining square match, a few options remain. A few "special items" help clear out blocks that do not necessarily match, such as an airplane block that eliminates a full line of square in the direction it is pointed in, or a block of dynamite that blows up every square touching it. Additionally, the player can also chose to drop new, randomly generated squares into the equation.

Development
The game is commonly attributed to being designed by Alexey Pajitnov, who also originally designed Tetris, and published by Spectrum HoloByte, the company who first published Tetris outside of Soviet Union, Pajitnov's home country. However, despite Pajitnov's name and face being on the game's title screen and box art, the PC version of the game clearly states that he only "endorses" and his only actual credits for the game is a "Special Thanks".<ref>BreakThru! -  Back Game Cover, PC Version,: "BreakThru carries on the challenging and addicting tradition of Tetris and I am proud to endorse this product. I hope you enjoy playing it as much as I do. - Alexey Pajitnov, Mathematician and Puzzle Game Designer</ref>

After being released for the MS-DOS and Super NES, the game was later ported to the original Game Boy. Because the game's original concept is so heavily based on matching same colored squares, the squares in this version of the game have different patterns within them to distinguish between different square types. Another version of the game, identical to the Super NES version, was made playable on the Genesis exclusively through the Sega Channel subscription service, which allowed subscribers to temporarily download games to their Genesis system for as long as the system was left on. Additionally, ports for the PlayStation and Sega Saturn were released exclusively in Japan. A version for Game Gear was planned but never released.

Reception
Reception for the game was generally mixed. Reviewing the Game Boy version, GamePro praised a few aspects, such as the ability to reverse approaching blocks, but felt that the "eye-straining graphics" severely hamper the gameplay: "While Tetris has simple, easy-to-see shapes that fall individually, BreakThru! has a complex wall of tiny, hard-to-see bricks with special bricks and bombs that are sometimes difficult to identify." However, they commented that this problem is considerably alleviated when playing on the Super Game Boy. They gave a more positive review of the SNES version. Though they criticized some aspects of the graphics, they applauded the game's simple-to-learn yet strategically deep gameplay and variety of modes. Reviewing the SNES version, a Next Generation critic said it was "OK" but too derivative of Tetris to be of real interest. He remarked that the use of special objects complicates the gameplay without truly adding to it, and gave the game two out of five stars.

In a retrospective review of the SNES version, Honest Gamers'' appreciated the initial concept of the game, but criticized how it frequently degrades into slow and frustrating gameplay once none of the remaining squares match each other. Allgame stated that while the graphics and sound effects were "less than dazzling", the gameplay was praised, stating that it had "...that special Pajitnov mix of simplicity and strategy that makes for a compelling, addictive experience."

Notes

References

External links
 BreakThru! at MobyGames
 Zoo Corporation official website

1994 video games
DOS games
Cancelled Game Gear games
Game Boy games
PlayStation (console) games
Puzzle video games
Realtime Associates games
Sega Saturn games
Super Nintendo Entertainment System games
Video games developed in Japan
Windows games
Zoo Corporation games
Multiplayer and single-player video games
Spectrum HoloByte games
Artech Studios games